Miklós Réthelyi (born 8 June 1939 in Zalaegerszeg) is a Hungarian physician and politician, former Minister of National Resources. This "super ministry" consisted of State Secretaries of Sport (Attila Czene), Education (Rózsa Hoffmann), Social Affairs (Miklós Soltész), Health (Miklós Szócska) and Culture (Géza Szőcs) during his appointment. When he was appointed, he stated he will only complete two years from his four year-term. On 3 May 2012 he resigned from his office. He is the first and last Minister to the office with this name, as it was renamed to Ministry of Human Resources on 14 May 2012 with Zoltán Balog taking over as Réthelyi's successor.

Main publications
The large synaptic complexes of the substantia gelatinosa (with János Szentágothai, 1969)
Cell and neuropil architecture of the intermedio-lateral (sympathetic) nucleus of the spinal cord (1972)
A gerincvelő neuronális szerkezete (1972)
Preterminal and terminal axon arborizations in the substantia gelatinosa of cat’s spinal cord (1977)
Synaptic complexes formed by functionally defined primary afferent units with fine myelinated fibers (co-author, 1982)
A fájdalomkeltő impulzusok gerincvelői feldolgozásának szerkezeti alapjai (1982)
Ultrastructure and synaptic connections of cutaneous afferent fibres in the spinal cord (co-author, 1987)
Funkcionális anatómia I.–III. (school book with János Szentágothai, 1989)
The caudal end of the rat spinal cord: transformation to and ultrastructure of the filum terminale (co-author, 2004)
Caudal end of the rat spinal dorsal horn (co-author, 2008)

References
MTI ki kicsoda 2009, Magyar Távirati Iroda Zrt., Budapest 2008, 917. old. 
Életrajz a Semmelweis Egyetem Szentágothai János Laboratóriumának honlapján
Bejegyzés az Országos Doktori és Habilitációs Tanács oldalán

|-

|-

1939 births
Living people
Government ministers of Hungary
Hungarian histologists
People from Zalaegerszeg
Members of the European Academy of Sciences and Arts